The Mammutmuseum Niederweningen (literally: Mammoth Museum Niederweningen) is a paleontological and geological museum in the municipality of Niederweningen in the Wehntal valley, Canton of Zürich, Switzerland, and one of the few mammoth museums in Europe.

Background 
About 185,000 years ago, a side lobe of the Walensee/Rein glacier overlapped on the threshold at the present Pfannenstiel eastern slope from Hombrechtikon into the Glatttal towards Niederweningen, and eroded the overdeepened rock rut of the present Wehntal area. During melting of the glacier, Wehntal, the lower Glatttal and Furttal valleys filled about 180,000 to 150,000 years ago with cold glacial lakes. After another glacier maximum about 140,000 years ago, the ice melted in the last Eemian (interglacial) period back far into the alpine valleys, and during the Würm glaciation and again about 45,000 years ago, mammoths and other Ice Age animals lived in the largely silted Wehntal. With the increasing warming period about 20,000 years ago, the glaciers melted away in stages to Zürich, later Hurden and formed the Seedamm at the Obersee lake area respectively the Ufenau, Lützelau and Heilig Hüsli islands on Zürichsee, and finally retreated into the alpine mountains.

History and orientation 
In 1890 the most important site of Ice Age animals in Switzerland was discovered in Niederweningen: 100 bones, molar teeth and tusks of at least 7 different individuals of mammoths, including a very young calf, were found in a peat horizon at the base of a gravel pit.

In 2003 the remains of a mammoth were found, and further finds resulted in the establishment of the present Mammutmuseum Niederweningen near the site of the first findings.

Various exhibits range from the colonization in historical times to the flora and fauna of the Ice Age, and further back to the living resources of the tropical Jura sea. Along with the historical finds of 1890/91, further at least ten mammoths have been found nearby, including a very young mammoth calf. Other fossil finds date back to other glacial animals, such as woolly rhinoceros, wild horse, steppe bison, wolf and cave hyena.

In October 2015 an interactive multimedia installation for the visitors was inaugurated, when the exhibition was renewed on occasion of the museum's 10th anniversary. One of the most important objects in the museum are the reconstructions of the 2003 finding and of a mammoth calf found near the museum site in 2005. The museum also houses the geological project Eiszeiten und Klimawandel der vergangenen 500 000 Jahre im Wehntal, that researched the climate change and glacial periods of the last 500,000 years in the Wehntal valley. The past ten years more than 41,000 visitors have viewed the exhibitions. The small museum team is also supported by a volunteer team of 35 active members of its booster club.

Facilities 
Public transportation is provided by the S-Bahn Zürich line S15 (ZVV) to Niederweningen Dorf. As the museum (as of May 2016) only opens Sunday's 2 pm to 5 pm, after hours visits are available by appointment, as well as guided tours for groups.

References

External links 

  

2005 establishments in Switzerland
Museums established in 2005
Museums in the canton of Zürich
Fossil museums
Natural history museums in Switzerland
Geology museums
Paleontology in Switzerland
Niederweningen